Umut Taniş (born 10 February 2004) is a Turkish footballer who plays as a winger for the Under-19 squad of Yeni Malatyaspor.

Career
Taniş is a youth product of Yeni Malatyaspor, and was promoted to their senior team in 2022. He made his professional debut with Yeni Malayaspor in a 1–0 Süper Lig loss to Giresunspor on 10 April 2022.

References

External links
 

2004 births
Living people
Sportspeople from Şırnak
Turkish footballers
Association football wingers
Yeni Malatyaspor footballers
Süper Lig players